Maleagant (alternately Malagant, Meleagan, Meleagant, Meliagant, Meliagaunt, Meliagant, Meliaganz, Meliagrance, Meliagrant, Mellegrans, Mellyagraunce) is a villain from Arthurian legend. In a number of versions of a popular episode, Maleagant abducts King Arthur’s wife, Queen Guinevere, necessitating her rescue by Arthur and his knights. The earliest surviving version of this episode names the abductor Melwas; as Maleagant, he debuts as Lancelot's archenemy in Chrétien de Troyes' French romance Lancelot, the Knight of the Cart. However, all surviving versions seem to be later adaptations of a stock narrative of significantly earlier provenance.

Melwas

The earliest version of the popular abduction-of-Guinevere motif appears in the early 12th-century Latin Life of Gildas by Caradoc of Llancarfan. In that text, Melwas, king of the "Summer Country" (regnante in aestiua regione; a direct translation of the Old Welsh name for Somerset, Gwlad yr Haf), carries Guinevere (Gwenhwyfar) off to his stronghold of Glastonbury. Arthur locates her after a year of searching and prepares to storm the castle, but Gildas negotiates her safe return. Melwas also appears in a fragmentary Welsh dialogue, indicating that this story was widely known in Wales. An early 12th-century monumental carving on the archivolt of Modena Cathedral in Italy contains a related scene, in which Arthur and his warriors besiege a castle where a character identified as Mardoc sits with Winlogee, presumably Guinevere.

Roger Sherman Loomis regarded the form Maleagant or Meleagans as directly derivative of the Brythonic Melwas. He listed a number of variants, including Mehaloas, Melians and Malvasius.

Maleagant

Maleagant (spelled Meliagant or Meliaganz) first appears under that name in Lancelot, the Knight of the Cart by Chrétien de Troyes, where he is said to be the son of King Bagdemagus, ruler of the otherworldly realm of Gorre (the Land of No Return), and brings the abducted Guinevere to his impenetrable castle out of his one-sided love for Arthur's wife. The queen is rescued by Lancelot and Gawain; this is the first major appearance of Lancelot in Arthurian legend. In this story, Maleagant has multiple sisters, one of whom betrays him to save an imprisoned Lancelot, who had earlier helped her by beheading her enemy.

Maleagant's role seems to have diminished as Mordred became more popular. Nevertheless, he has continued to appear in most accounts of Guinevere's kidnapping. Notably, he plays that part in the Lancelot-Grail cycle and consequently in Thomas Malory's Le Morte d'Arthur. In Malory's telling, Maleagant kidnaps Guinevere and her unarmed knights and holds them prisoner in his castle. After Maleagant's archers kill his horse, Lancelot has to ride to the castle in a cart in order to save the queen. Knowing Lancelot was on his way, Maleagant pleads to Guinevere for mercy, which she grants and then forces Lancelot to stifle his rage against Maleagant. Later, Maleagant learns of Guinevere's unfaithfulness to Arthur and is willing to fight in a duel at Arthur's court in an attempt to prove it to others. After Guinevere made it known that she wants Maleagant dead, Lancelot kills him even though Maleagant begs for mercy. However, this happens only after Maleagant agreed to continue fighting with Lancelot's helmet removed, his left side body armour removed, and his left hand tied behind his back (Lancelot felt it necessary to finish the bout, but would not slay Maleagant unless Maleagant agreed to continue fighting).

In the romance Sone de Nansai, the hero Sone visits an island said to have been Meleagan's, whose father was Baudemagus; his grandfather was named Tadus. Meleagan's island is perfectly square and its walls are made of crystal; there is a palace at each corner and a fountain wells up through a gilded copper horn at the center. The Sword Bridge connects the island to a causeway, a bowshot away, which leads to the mainland. In Meleagan's day, many men were beheaded there.

Modern fiction
Maleagant appears in modern retellings like Marion Zimmer Bradley's The Mists of Avalon and T. H. White's The Once and Future King (as Sir Meliagrance).
 In the aftermath of the desperate battle at the end of Mark Twain's A Connecticut Yankee in King Arthur's Court, the protagonist, time traveling American Hank Morgan, tries to help the severely wounded Sir Maleagant, but is stabbed by him. 
In The Warlord Chronicles novels by English author Bernard Cornwell, based on the Arthurian legend, a secondary character named Melwas is mentioned many times, here as the king of the tribe of the Belgae, who inhabited the region roughly corresponding to modern Hampshire with its capital at Venta Belgarum (modern Winchester). At first glance, the only similarity between the legendary character and the fictional one seems to be their common name, but, upon closer inspection, we find some clues that indicate a possible intention of the author of having his fictional Melwas to be his own peculiar version of Maleagant. A couple of similarities include the fact that, in the novels, Melwas is a vassal to King Uther Pendragon (Arthur's father) and, after his death, to his grandson, the child King Mordred, to whom Arthur serves as Regent during his minority, while Maleagant himself was a vassal to King Arthur. Both became members of the Round Table in its respective versions in the novels and in the Arthurian legend, and both betrayed their sovereigns by raising arms against them.
In the French TV series Kaamelott, Meleagant is a dark and mysterious entity, either a god or a wizard, portrayed by Carlo Brandt. He seems omniscient, able to predict the future and appear in people's dreams. His goal seems to push Lancelot to explore the darkest sides of his personality. Meleagant also pushes King Arthur and the Roman Emperor to commit suicide. While Caesar dies, Arthur survives his suicide attempt. However, as Arthur is on his death bed, he handles the power to Lancelot, still under Meleagant's influence. Manipulating the knight, Meleagant pushes Lancelot to establish a dictatorship over the Kingdom of Logres, while Arthur flees, with the help of the smuggler Venec, to Rome. 
He appears in the 1995 film First Knight as a murderous renegade knight of the Round Table, portrayed by Ben Cross.
Melwas appears in Giles Kristian’s novel Lancelot as an antagonist of the title character from boyhood.

References

Bibliography
 Lacy, Norris J. (1991). The New Arthurian Encyclopedia. New York: Garland. .
 Loomis, Roger Sherman (1997). Celtic Myth and Arthurian Romance. Academy Chicago Publishers. .

External links 
 Meleagant at The Camelot Project

Arthurian characters
Fictional princes
Knights of the Round Table
People from Glastonbury